The structure of the Australian Army changed considerably during World War II. At the outbreak of war the Army comprised a small regular component and a large, but ill-trained and equipped, militia force. In September 1939 the government authorised the establishment of the Second Australian Imperial Force for overseas service; this force eventually reached a strength of four infantry divisions, an armoured division and various headquarters and support units. The militia force, which remained in Australia, was neglected until the outbreak of the Pacific War.

The militia units were fully activated in late 1941, and additional such formations were established in 1942. Despite the loss of the 8th Division in February 1942, the Army reached its peak strength of eleven infantry divisions and three armoured divisions later that year. This force was larger than what the Australian economy could support, however, and was gradually reduced in size. At the end of 1943 the Government determined that the Army's strength was to be six infantry divisions and two armoured brigades, though further reductions were ordered in August 1944 and June 1945. If the conflict had continued past August 1945, the size of the Army would have been further reduced to three divisions.

Following the end of the war the Australian Army was rapidly demobilized. However, the force formed for occupation duties in Australia became the nucleus of the permanent Australian Regular Army, and a large number of militia units continued to be maintained.

Orders of battle

3 September 1939
On the outbreak of war, the Army comprised the following major units:

Military Board
Army Headquarters
1st Division
2nd Division
3rd Division
4th Division
5th Division
1st Cavalry Division
2nd Cavalry Division
Department of the Chief of the General Staff
1st Military District – Queensland
2nd Military District – New South Wales
3rd Military District – Victoria
4th Military District – South Australia
5th Military District – Western Australia
6th Military District – Tasmania
7th Military District – Northern Territory
8th Military District – New Guinea
Royal Military College, Duntroon
Command and Staff School
Small Arms School
Army Service Corps Training School
School of Artillery
Department of the Adjutant-General
Department of the Quartermaster-General and Master-General of the Ordnance

9 April 1942
The Army was restructured in 1942, with major units as follows:

 Land Headquarters
 First Army
 I Corps
 3rd Division
 7th Division
 5th Division
 1st Motor Division
 II Corps
 1st Division
 2nd Division
 10th Division
 Second Army
 2nd Motor Division
 Tasmania Force
 US 41st Division
 III Corps
 4th Division
 Northern Territory Force
 19th Brigade Group
 Northern Territory Lines of Communication Area
 New Guinea Force
 LHQ Reserve
 1st Armoured Division
 2/2nd Pioneer Battalion
 2/1st Machine Gun Battalion
 LHQ Troops
 AIF (Overseas)
 6th Division
 9th Division
 Queensland Line of Communications Area
 New South Wales Line of Communication Area
 Victoria Line of Communication Area
 South Australia Line of Communication Area
 Tasmania Line of Communication Area
 Western Australia Line of Communication Area
 New Guinea Line of Communication Area

15 August 1945
The structure of the Army's major combat units and commands at the end of the war was as follows:
Land Headquarters
I Corps
7th Division
9th Division
4th Armoured Brigade Group (Land Headquarters reserve)
First Army
6th Division
11th Division
8th Brigade
Pacific Islands Regiment
II Corps
3rd Division
11th Brigade
23rd Brigade
Second Army
1st Brigade
5th Division [was transferred to Queensland Line of Communications Area on 19 August]
Northern Territory Force
12th Brigade
Western Command
New South Wales Line of Communications Area
Queensland Line of Communications Area
South Australia Line of Communications Area
Tasmania Line of Communications Area
Victoria Line of Communications Area

See also
Australian Army during World War II
Australian armoured units of World War II
List of Australian divisions in World War II
Anti-aircraft defences of Australia during World War II
Coastal defences of Australia during World War II
Jungle division
Structure of the Australian Army during World War I

Notes

References

Further reading

 

 
 
 
 
 

Military history of Australia during World War II
World War II orders of battle
Australian Army